Ulrike Sindelar-Pachowsky (born 25 June 1943) is an Austrian diver. She competed in two events at the 1964 Summer Olympics.

References

1943 births
Living people
Austrian female divers
Olympic divers of Austria
Divers at the 1964 Summer Olympics
Place of birth missing (living people)